Mohd Syukur Saidin (born 12 November 1991) is a Malaysian footballer who plays as a midfielder for Penang in the Malaysia Premier League.

Career
Syukur started his football career with Sime Darby Presidents Cup Team. He was promoted to the senior team in 2011 and still plays with them, as of May 2014.

Personal life
Amer Saidin, his youngest brother also a professional footballer.

Honours
Penang FA
 Malaysia Premier League: 2020
 Malaysia Premier League: Promotion 2015

References

External links
 Sime Darby FC official profile
 

1991 births
Living people
Malaysian footballers
Penang F.C. players
People from Penang
Malaysian people of Malay descent
Sportspeople from Penang
Association football midfielders